FC Vahonobudivnyk Kremenchuk is a Ukrainian amateur football club from Kremenchuk. It is a factory team of the Kryukiv Railway Car Building Works based at the right-bank neighborhood of Kremenchuk.

Previously the team (club) was known as Dzerzhynets and Avanhard.

League and cup history

{|class="wikitable"
|-bgcolor="#efefef"
! Season
! Div.
! Pos.
! Pl.
! W
! D
! L
! GS
! GA
! P
!Domestic Cup
!colspan=2|Europe
!Notes
|}

Honours
 Poltava Oblast
 Winners (4): 1948, 1952, 1955, 1965, 1970

References

Football clubs in Kremenchuk
Amateur football clubs in Ukraine
Association football clubs established in 1949
1949 establishments in Ukraine